A relaxer is a type of lotion or cream generally used by people with tight curls or very curly hair which makes hair easier to straighten by chemically "relaxing" the natural curls. The active agent is usually a strong alkali, although some formulations are based on ammonium thioglycolate or formaldehyde.

History 
The first documented history of the relaxer began with Garrett Augustus Morgan in 1909.  His hair straighten cream was found accidentally when trying to find a solution to ease friction on sewing machines in his tailor shop.  Morgan tested his cream on a neighboring dog's fur.  With the success of the cream, he established G.A. Morgan Hair Refining Company and began selling his product to Black/mixed people.

General usage
Hair relaxing, or lanthionization, colloquially known as a perm, can be performed by a professional cosmetologist in a salon, a professional barber in a barbershop or at home with relaxer kits. As with hair dye, the treated portion of the hair moves away from the scalp as the new growth of untreated hair sprouts up from the roots, requiring periodic retreatment (about every 8–11 weeks) to maintain a consistent appearance.

The relaxer is applied to the base of the hair shaft and remains in place for a "cooking" interval, during which it alters the hair's texture by a process of controlled damage to the protein structure. The hair can be significantly weakened by the physical overlap of excessive applications or by a single excessive one, leading to brittleness, breakage, or even widespread alopecia.

When the relaxer has worked to the desired degree, the hair is rinsed clean. Regardless of formula, relaxers are always alkaline to some degree, so it is prudent to neutralize or even slightly acidify the hair with a suitable shampoo immediately afterward. The prompt use of hair conditioner is also important in order to replace some of the natural oils that were stripped away by the process.

Types

Thio relaxers

Thio relaxers use ATG, or ammonium thioglycolate, which is also used in permanent waving, but at a much higher pH and concentration than used in permanent waves.  It is usually higher than a pH of 10.  These relaxers are also thicker with a higher viscosity, or thickness, which makes for an easier relaxer application.  Thio relaxers break the disulfide bonds in hair, similar to the permanent waving process.  When enough of the disulfide bonds in the hair are broken, the relaxer is rinsed from the hair and the hair is towel dried.  After towel drying, a neutralizer of some sort is applied to the hair.

Alkaline and lye relaxers
Garrett Augustus Morgan observed that it is possible to change the basic structure of the hair shaft when certain chemicals penetrate the cuticle layer. Hair relaxing products often require washing and combing with soap which had been made with excess lye. The scalp can suffer severe chemical burns if over exposed to lye or no-lye relaxers..

A lye relaxer consists of sodium hydroxide (also known as NaOH or lye) mixed with water, petroleum jelly, mineral oil, and emulsifiers to create a creamy consistency. On application, the caustic "lye cream" permeates the protein structure of the hair and weakens its internal bonds, causing the natural curls to loosen out as the entire fiber swells open. No special deactivation step is required after washing the lye cream out, other than the routine pH adjustment and hair-conditioning.

Manufacturers vary the sodium hydroxide content of the solution from 5% to 10% and the pH between 10 and 14.

"Base" and "no base" formulas
Entirely distinct from the chemical concept of base as a wider definition for "alkaline", lye relaxers may be labelled as "base" or "no base". In this instance, the "base" refers to a preliminary coating of petroleum jelly onto the scalp to protect it from being irritated or burned by the lye cream. "No base" creams have a lower concentration of lye and may be applied directly to the hair roots without requiring the protective "base" layer, although these weaker products may still irritate the skin of some people who must therefore coat their scalps beforehand anyway.

"No lye" relaxers
Because of increasing awareness of the potential dangers of sodium hydroxide found in traditional relaxer formulas, many women have begun abandoning them. "No-lye" relaxers have become increasingly popular. "No-lye" relaxers are of three main types. One type operates on the same general principle as lye relaxers but uses a slightly weaker alkaline agent, such as potassium hydroxide, lithium hydroxide, or guanidine hydroxide. The last of these is not pre-formulated, but rather is generated at the time of use by combining a cream containing calcium hydroxide (slaked lime) with an "activating solution" of guanidine carbonate.

Another type of "no-lye" relaxer uses ammonium thioglycolate, which is also known as perm salt for its use in permanent waves. Perm salt is a chemical reducing agent which selectively weakens the hair's cystine bonds instead of disrupting the entire protein, but strips out the natural oils even more thoroughly than the alkali hydroxide products. Afterward, the thioglycolate must be oxidized with a special solution of hydrogen peroxide or sodium bromate.

Lastly, in most relaxers sold for home use, the active agents are ammonium sulfite and ammonium bisulfite (the two compounds are interchangeable, depending on the surrounding pH). These also selectively reduce the cystine bonds, but are much weaker and work more slowly. Nevertheless, their mild action minimizes (but does not entirely eliminate) collateral irritation to the skin.

Commercial sale
Early in the 1900s hair relaxing products emerged, such as "G.A. brandi's hair Cream." Sale of "lye relaxers" began in 1917 by companies such as Proline. They also produced the first commercial "no lye relaxer" using potassium hydroxide in 1919.

A product falsely marketed as chemical-free in the 1990s, the Rio Hair Naturalizer System, led to a class action lawsuit against the manufacturer, the World Rio Corporation Inc., when the acidic chemicals it contained caused scalp damage and/or hair loss to thousands of users. The product was eventually withdrawn from the market.

Down Perm
A Down Perm is a type of hair relaxing product used in Asia with its origins in South Korea. It is designed to relax Asian hair which tends to stick out, most noticeably after washing it.

Risks
The hair of some Africans is elliptical in shape and therefore very tightly curled (Asian hair tends to be round and Caucasian hair is in-between). The relaxer cream breaks down the chemical bonds of the hair shaft, disrupting the elliptical shape and reconstructing the bonds in a different way. Though hair follicles themselves are not damaged, the hair can become very brittle and break off. There is also risk of scalp burns if the relaxer comes into contact with the skin. Some professionals apply a scalp base cream or protector prior to application to protect the client's scalp from chemical burns. Cosmetic products are not subject to pre-market approval by the Food and Drug Administration and a complete list of ingredients is not mandatory; however many brands of hair relaxers list phthalate directly as one of their chemical ingredients. Phthalates from cosmetic products can be inhaled or absorbed by the skin and these have been shown to have estrogenic effects in cell models and experimental animals. It also can cause long-term damage that may not recover.

Uterine leiomyomata
A prospective cohort study of more than 23,000 African-American women showed an association between the use of relaxers and risk of uterine leiomyomata. The incidence of this disease is 2 to 3 times higher in African-Americans than Caucasian women.  However, the paper makes no causal connections between relaxers and uterine fibroids, even though some media outlets have reported otherwise.

Breast cancer
A potential causal link between relaxers and breast cancer was found by researchers associated with the Black Women’s Health Study

See also 
 Afro-textured hair
 Hair iron
 Hair straightening
 Hot comb
 Natural hair
 Perm (hairstyle)
 Garret Morgan

References

Garrett Augustus Morgan Cleveland Business Man and Inventor.  Rhode Island College

External links
 List of articles from National Library of Medicine and National Institutes of Health regarding relaxers
 Hair Care: An Illustrated Dermatologic Handbook
 Chemical and Physical Behavior of Human Hair

Hairdressing
African-American hair